Averino is the name of several rural localities in Russia:
Averino, Belgorod Oblast, a selo in Gubkinsky District of Belgorod Oblast
Averino, Ivanovo Oblast, a village in Zavolzhsky District of Ivanovo Oblast
Averino, Kostroma Oblast, a village in Pavinskoye Settlement of Pavinsky District in Kostroma Oblast; 
Averino, Nizhny Novgorod Oblast, a village in Loyminsky Selsoviet of Sokolsky District in Nizhny Novgorod Oblast
Averino, Vologda Oblast, a village in Ivanovsky Selsoviet of Vashkinsky District in Vologda Oblast
Averino, Voronezh Oblast, a khutor in Korotoyakskoye Rural Settlement of Ostrogozhsky District in Voronezh Oblast